Akköy is a village in the Didim district of Aydın Province, Turkey, situated near the western Turkish coast just south of İzmir. The town is named after its white stone houses ("ak" is Turkish for white, "köy" means village).

The village of Akköy is close to the ruins of the ancient city of Miletus.

Akköy lies just south of the Büyük Menderes river delta.

External links
 Tourism information about the village

Villages in Didim District